Peter Wishart could refer to: 

Pete Wishart (born 1962), Scottish politician and musician
Peter Wishart (composer) (1921-1984), English composer
Peter Wishart (cricketer) (born 1937), Australian cricketer